Agostinho Fortes Filho (9 September 1901 – 2 May 1966) was a Brazilian football player. He was a member of the Brazilian squad at the 1930 FIFA World Cup finals and won two South American Championship (1919, 1922).

Honours

Club
 Campeonato Carioca (4): 
Fluminense: 1917, 1918, 1919, 1924

National
 South American Championship (2): 
Brazil: 1919, 1922

References

1901 births
1966 deaths
Footballers from Rio de Janeiro (city)
Brazilian footballers
Brazil international footballers
1930 FIFA World Cup players
Fluminense FC players
Place of death missing
Association football midfielders